A driving licence in Singapore is required before a person is allowed to drive a motor vehicle of any description on a road in the country. Like many other countries in the world, an individual must possess a valid driving licence before being permitted to drive on the road, and driving licence holders are subject to all traffic rules.

The minimum age to drive a motor vehicle and getting a Qualified Driving Licence (QDL) in Singapore is 18 years old. The driving licence is for the normal lifespan of a person, but continued eligibility to drive requires a medical clearance after reaching the age of 65.

For those who accumulated 13 demerit points and above within one year probation, the licence will be revoked. Driving licences in Singapore are administered by the Traffic Police of the Singapore Police Force (SPF).

Classes of driving licence
The classification of motor vehicles and eligibility of a driving licence in Singapore is as follows:

Types of driving licence

 Provisional driving licence (PDL) - possessed by learners in driving schools. A PDL can only be applied after passing the basic theory test (BTT), which can be taken at any of the established driving schools in Singapore. This licence itself carries several restrictions:
 A certified driving instructor must be present to guide the learner driver.
 A learner driver is not allowed to use the expressway and some busy roads such as those in Chinatown and Orchard Road.
 A "L" plate must be placed at the front and rear of the car.
 A PDL is valid for 6 months from the date of grant and can be renewed subsequently for every 6 months if the licence is granted before 1 Dec 2017. 
 PDLs granted after 1 Dec 2017 will be revamped to 2 years validity officially to allow learners to have more time to learn and pass their driving tests.
 People above the age of 65 will be required to pass a medical examination when they apply for or renew their PDLs.

Upon the passing of a final theory test, the learner driver can then proceed to take the practical driving test.

 Qualified driving licence - full licence. On passing the practical driving test, a driving licence will be issued. The licence holder will undergo a 1-year probation period, in which they are required to display the probationary licence plate, a triangular plate, at the top right portion of the front windscreen and the rear windscreen, as seen from the outside of the vehicle. If the licence holder accumulates more than 12 demerit points within the probationary year, the licence will be revoked. Failure to display Probationary Licence plates may also cause the offending driver to receive a fine for the first time, then an immediate revocation for the subsequent time.
However, if the driver has a licence of class 3A that has had lasted a year or more and they recently passed their class 3 (manual) licence for less than a year, they will need to only place the probationary licence plate when driving a class 3 (manual) vehicle.

 Vocational driving licence (VDL) - a special driving licence for commercial vehicle drivers of taxis and buses. There are three types of VDL:  bus driver vocational licence, private hire car driver vocational license, and taxi driver vocational licence. To apply for the bus driver vocational licence, the applicant must have a Class 3 Singapore driving licence with at least one year's driving experience and a clean driving record and be at least 21 years old. To apply for the taxi driver vocational licence, the applicant must be a Singapore citizen of at least 30 years of age and have a qualified Class 3 Singapore driving licence with at least one year's driving experience and a clean driving record. To apply for the private hire car driver vocational licence, the applicant must be a Singapore citizen of at least 30 years of age and have a qualified Class 3 Singapore driving licence with at least one years' driving experience and a clean driving record.

Conversion of driving licence
Foreigners holding foreign driving licence and intend to remain in Singapore for less than twelve months are not required to convert their foreign driving licence to a Singaporean driving licence. They may drive in Singapore with a valid foreign driving licence. However, if the licence is not in English, in addition to a valid foreign driving licence, they are required to have an International Driving Permit/IDP. If an IDP is not available, an official translation of the driving licence in English is required. Foreigners from ASEAN member countries need to possess a valid driving licence to drive in Singapore but would not need to require an IDP.

To convert to a Singaporean driving licence, the foreigner is required to pass the Basic Theory Test (BTT) for familiarisation of traffic rules and Singapore's Highway Code pertaining to traffic related issues specific to Singapore. A Singaporean Permanent Resident (PR) who wishes to drive in Singapore is required to convert their foreign driving licence after becoming a PR.

References

External links
Singapore Traffic Police's website on Driving in Singapore
Singapore Safety Driving Center (SSDC)
Bukit Batok Driving Centre (BBDC)
ComfortDelGro Driving Centre

Singapore
Road transport in Singapore